Karl-Heinz is a German given name, composed of Karl and Heinz but with a hyphen dash. Notable people with that name include:

 Hilarios Karl-Heinz Ungerer, German Bishop
 Karl-Heinz Feldkamp (born 1934), football coach and former player
 Karl-Heinz Florenz (born 1947), German Member of the European Parliament
 Karl-Heinz Granitza (born 1951), German football player
 Karl-Heinz Grasser (born 1969), Austrian politician
 Karl-Heinz Greisert (1908-1942), German World War II Luftwaffe Ace
 Karl-Heinz Irmer (1903-1975), German field hockey player
 Karl-Heinz Keitel (born 1914), Waffen-SS officer and son of Wilhelm Keitel
 Karl-Heinz Kipp, German businessperson
 Karl-Heinz Köpcke, (1922–1991), German journalist
 Karl-Heinz "Charly" Körbel (born 1954), German former professional football defender
 Karl-Heinz Krüger (born 1953), retired boxer
 Karl-Heinz Kunde (born 1938), former German cyclist
 Karl-Heinz Lambertz (born 1952), jurist and politician
 Karl-Heinz Luck (born 1945), former East German Nordic combined skier
 Karl-Heinz Metzner (1923-1994), German footballer
 Karl-Heinz Riedle (born 1965), former German professional footballer
 Karl-Heinz Rummenigge (born 1955), former football player
 Karl-Heinz Schnellinger (born 1939), former German footballer
 Karl-Heinz Smuda (born 1961), German journalist
 Karl-Heinz Stadtmüller (born 1953), former East German race walker
 Karl-Heinz Tritschler (born 1949), former football referee from Germany
 Karl-Heinz Urban, (born 1972) New Zealand actor
 Karl-Heinz von Liebezeit (born 1960), German television actor
 Karl-Heinz Vosgerau (born 1928), German television actor

See also

 Carl-Heinz
 Karlheinz

German masculine given names